Zamah Cunningham (November 29, 1892 – June 2, 1967) was an American stage, film, and television actress. She began her career appearing in uncredited bit parts for D. W. Griffith, making her film debut in his 1924 silent feature, America. She later had an extensive career on Broadway, making her stage debut there in 1933's Give Us This Day. Cunningham went on to appear in numerous stage plays over the following several decades, though she publicly commented that most of her plays were "flops."

In her later career, she appeared in several films, including Dream Girl (1948), Here Come the Girls (1953), and Baby the Rain Must Fall (1965). Beginning in 1956, she made several guest appearances as Angelina Manciotti, neighbor of the Kramdens on the sitcom The Honeymooners. Cunningham died at Roosevelt Hospital in Manhattan in June 1967, aged 74.

Life and career
Cunningham was born in 1892 in Portland, Oregon. At age two, she relocated with her family to Carthage, Missouri. She began her career as a singer before relocating to New York City to study acting. After appearing in local stage productions, she was secured a working contract with D. W. Griffith, appearing in uncredited bit parts in his films. In 1924, she made her film debut in Germany, appearing in Griffith's America. She subsequently studied music in Paris, and was given opportunity to appear in productions at the Opera Comique. She later returned to the United States, where she joined the Chicago Playhouse and appeared in regional productions.

Cunningham made her Broadway debut in 1933's Give Us This Day. She went on to appear in over 20 Broadway productions over the following two decades, including On the Town (1944) and The Shadow of a Gunman (1958). Reflecting on her stage career in 1944, she commented: "In the past 20 years I've been in fifty plays—mostly flops."

Later film roles included Dream Girl (1948), Key to the City (1950), and Here Come the Girls (1953). She made her final film appearance in Baby the Rain Must Fall (1965).

Cunningham spent her later life living at the Park Royal Hotel on 23 West 73rd Street in Manhattan's Upper West Side. In her early seventies, she suffered a stroke.

Death
Cunningham died at Roosevelt Hospital in Manhattan on June 2, 1967. She was interred at Avilla Cemetery in Avilla, Missouri.

Filmography

Film

Television

Select stage credits

References

External links

1892 births
1967 deaths
Actresses from Portland, Oregon
American film actresses
American silent film actresses
American stage actresses
People from Carthage, Missouri
Actresses from Missouri
20th-century American actresses